Ellis Bernard Johnson (born October 30, 1973) is an American former college and professional football player who was a defensive tackle in the National Football League (NFL) for ten seasons during the 1990s and 2000s.  Johnson played college football for the University of Florida, and was recognized as the National Defensive Player of the Year.  He was picked in the first round of the 1995 NFL Draft, and played professionally for the Indianapolis Colts, Atlanta Falcons and Denver Broncos of the NFL.

Early life 

Johnson was born in Wildwood, Florida in 1973.  He attended Wildwood High School, where he played high school football for the Wildwood Wildcats.

College career 

Johnson accepted an athletic scholarship to attend the University of Florida in Gainesville, Florida, where he played for coach Steve Spurrier's Florida Gators football team from 1991 to 1994.  As a senior team captain on the Gators' 1994 Southeastern Conference (SEC) championship team, Johnson was a first-team All-SEC selection, an honorable mention All-American, and CNN's National Defensive Player of the Year; he was also selected by his Gators teammates as the team's most valuable player.  He finished his four years as a Gator with 16.3 quarterback sacks and 26.8 tackles for a loss.

In a retrospective series published by The Gainesville Sun in 2006, Johnson was rated No. 32 among the top 100 Gators of the first 100 seasons of Florida football.  He was inducted into the University of Florida Athletic Hall of Fame as a "Gator Great" in 2007.

Professional career

Indianapolis Colts
During those seven seasons, he started eighty-four of 104 games, recording 269 tackles, thirty-three quarterback sacks and two interceptions.

Atlanta Falcons
In the two years, he started five of thirty-two games, recording sixty-seven tackles, and fifteen sacks.

Denver Broncos 
Johnson was traded by the Falcons to the Denver Broncos before the  season in exchange for the Broncos' fifth-round selection in the 2005 NFL draft.  In his only season with the Broncos, he played in thirteen games, recording sixteen tackles, three sacks and an interception. The interception came on a deflected pass in the famous "snow game" with the Oakland Raiders, and Johnson put on an impressive burst of speed to reach the end zone.

Career Statistics 
In his ten-year NFL career, Johnson appeared in 149 regular season games, started in eighty-nine of them, and was responsible for 356 tackles.

See also 

 1994 College Football All-America Team
 Florida Gators football, 1990–99
 History of the Indianapolis Colts
 List of Florida Gators football All-Americans
 List of Florida Gators in the NFL Draft
 List of University of Florida Athletic Hall of Fame members
 List of Indianapolis Colts first-round draft picks

References

Bibliography 

 Carlson, Norm, University of Florida Football Vault: The History of the Florida Gators, Whitman Publishing, LLC, Atlanta, Georgia (2007).  .
 Golenbock, Peter, Go Gators!  An Oral History of Florida's Pursuit of Gridiron Glory, Legends Publishing, LLC, St. Petersburg, Florida (2002).  .
 Hairston, Jack, Tales from the Gator Swamp: A Collection of the Greatest Gator Stories Ever Told, Sports Publishing, LLC, Champaign, Illinois (2002).  .
 McCarthy, Kevin M.,  Fightin' Gators: A History of University of Florida Football, Arcadia Publishing, Mount Pleasant, South Carolina (2000).  .
 Nash, Noel, ed., The Gainesville Sun Presents The Greatest Moments in Florida Gators Football, Sports Publishing, Inc., Champaign, Illinois (1998).  .

1973 births
Living people
People from Wildwood, Florida
Players of American football from Florida
American football defensive ends
American football defensive tackles
Florida Gators football players
Indianapolis Colts players
Atlanta Falcons players
Denver Broncos players